S.O.B. (abbreviated from Sabotage Organized Barbarian) is a Japanese punk rock band formed in Osaka in 1983. Their original vocalist Yoshitomo "Tottsuan" Suzuki committed suicide in 1995. They are also considered hugely influential on grindcore bands such as Napalm Death and the genre of death metal as well as one of the mainstays of the thrashcore genre. The band have sometimes been described as grindcore, themselves.

Discography 
Albums
1987 – Don't Be Swindle
1988 – No Control
1990 – What's the Truth?
1993 – Gate of Doom
1994 – Vicious World
1995 – Symphonies of Brutality
1999 – Dub Grind
2003 – Still Grind Attitude

EPs
Sabotage Organized Barbarian (1985)
Leave Me Alone (1986)
Western Kids Omnibus 2 (Coke) (1986)
split w/ Napalm Death (1988)

Members 
Current line-up
Etsushi – lead vocals (2002–present)
Kawataka Daisuke – bass (1983–1986; 1990–present)
Toshimi Seki – guitar (1983–present)
Satoshi Yasue – drums (1983–present)

Past members
Kazuki Daido – bass (1986–1990)
Naoto Fukuhara – lead vocals (1995–2002)
Yoshitomo 'Tottsuan' Suzuki – lead vocals (1983–1995)

References 

Musical groups established in 1983
Musical groups from Osaka
1983 establishments in Japan
Japanese hardcore punk groups